The Kenmore Bypass is a proposal for a major road linking Moggill Road, Pinjarra Hills, with the Centenary Motorway, Kenmore, in Brisbane, Australia. The Proposed Bypass will be  in length.  Since the 1960s a corridor of land has been set aside for a bypass. This is where the Kenmore bypass will be located if the plans go ahead. The Bypass is stage 1 of the planned Moggill Pocket Arterial Road corridor.

Moggill pocket arterial road corridor
The Kenmore Bypass is stage 1 of the planned Moggill Pocket Arterial Road corridor, also known as the Moggill—Warrego Highway Connection, that connects the Centenary Highway, Fig Tree Pocket with the Warrego Highway, North Tivoli, via the suburbs of Kenmore, Pullenvale, Anstead and Karalee.

Benefits
The proposed Bypass is designed to alleviate congestion along Moggil Road during peak commuting hours.

The Kenmore Bypass Pre-feasibility Study concluded that a Kenmore Bypass would:
 Provide a  alternative road for the congested Moggill Road;
 Cater for an estimated of approximately 25,000 vehicles per day in 2026;
 Reduce rat running;
 Avoidance of two schools and two retail zones in Kenmore and 13 sets of traffic lights;
 Improve public transport on Moggill Road and 
 Enhance bicycle commuting connectivity between the Kenmore and the Centenary Motorway cycleway.

Planning process
The planning process, based on community feedback, looked at a range of options and more in-depth technical investigations.

Consultation
The Bypass has divided local residents and has been subject of extensive community planning to ensure the needs and opinions all residents are considered. The Kenmore Bypass Consultation report, that involved three stages and two additional interim consultation periods, received a total of 7,859 submissions between April 2008 and November 2009. The report highlighted the public issues regarding the Bypass, namely:
 Supportive of project (Stage 1) – 12.65%*
 Opposed to project (Stage 1) – 12.17%*
 Existing traffic issues: congestion – 7.22%
 Alternatives: Bellbowrie Bridge – 3.02%
 Public transport – 3%
 Moggill Road – 2.8%
 Future traffic issues: congestion – 2.49%
 Moggill Road intersection: travel in direction of Brisbane City – 2.07%
 Existing traffic issues: Public transport – 1.92%
 Environment: Loss of greenspace – 1.87%
 ‘Other’ issues accounted for 50.8% of the feedback received, including issues such as noise, land value and fauna.

Design
Design options have been published relating to:
 Moggill Road Intersection (options A & B), 
 Gem Road to Kenmore Road and 
 Centenary Motorway Interchange (options A & B and Fig Tree Pocket A & B).

Current status

The decision to proceed with the Kenmore Bypass rests with the Government of Queensland whose responsibility it is to assess the affordability and priority of the project. Currently there is no decision or funding to build a Kenmore Bypass.

The Moggill Pocket Arterial Road corridor, as determined by the Western Brisbane Transport Network Investigation, will not be required under the land use projections in the South East Queensland Regional Plan, but remains as an important future corridor.

See also

Road transport in Brisbane

References

External links
 YouTube Video of the Kenmore Bypass Community Meeting - 12 June 2008
 Kenmore Bypass Planning Study
 Debating Regional Transport Proposals - considers the Kenmore bypass option in a regional context
 Outline on Google Maps of the Brisbane section

Proposed roads in Australia
Roads in Brisbane
Kenmore, Queensland
Bypasses in Australia